Person Pitch is the third solo album by American recording artist Noah Lennox under his alias Panda Bear, released on March 20, 2007, by Paw Tracks. Departing stylistically from his prior work as both a member of Animal Collective and a solo artist, the album was recorded using the Boss SP-303 sampler, with instrumentation largely composed of manipulated samples and loops, accompanied by Lennox's layered vocals. He described it as a collection of "super dubby and old sounding" songs inspired by his then-recent marriage, fatherhood, and move to Portugal.

The album was met with universal critical acclaim, and later ranked among various "top 10 albums of the 2000s" lists. It is noted for influencing a wide range of subsequent indie music, including the chillwave genre and numerous soundalike acts. Five of the album's seven tracks were issued as A-sided singles before the album's release: "I'm Not" and "Comfy in Nautica" (2005), "Bros" (2006), "Carrots" and "Take Pills" (2007).

Background and recording
Lennox recorded Person Pitch over a two-year period, working slowly because he lacked large stretches of time to dedicate to the material in between tours with Animal Collective. In response to this, he entertained the idea of releasing a series of 12-inch singles over time which would then eventually be compiled into a singles album, a practice inspired by dance producers such as Basic Channel. Initially, Lennox wanted to name it Perfect Pitch before settling on Person Pitch – "pitch being sound and person being a person with person pitch being a sound of a person." He attributed the brighter sound of the project to his move to Lisbon, Portugal and recent familial developments, saying:

When Lennox moved to Lisbon, he was initially unable to bring his guitar into the country after it was held up in customs. He was, however, able to bring a Boss SP-303 sampler which he had been experimenting with in previous months, inspired by the work of hip hop producer Madlib. As a result, the album is primarily composed of samples. Lennox estimates that "it's like 96% samples, 10% of which I actually played," with most taken from songs heard on the radio or short recordings found on the Internet. Sampled sources include a track by pop singer Kylie Minogue, a rondo by the 14th-century composer Guillaume de Machaut, a dub reggae production by Lee "Scratch" Perry, and 1960s instrumental group the Tornados performing "Popeye Twist." When working with samples of other material, he "tried pretty hard to hide the stuff or make it my own in some way" by applying elements such as effects and EQ treatments, and he developed melodies as he played these samples. Despite his previous drumming with Animal Collective, Lennox did not perform drums on the album.

Music

Person Pitch departs from the guitar-based sound and loosely rock-oriented format of Lennox's previous work, both as a member of Animal Collective and on his solo releases. Instead it is constructed primarily out of "carefully mapped-out samples, minimal beats, and endless layers of his own reverb-saturated vocal harmonies." The Sydney Morning Herald noted elements such as “watery electronics, washed-out samples and Beach Boys-y vocals,” while AllMusic characterized the album as a "patchwork" of "repurposed samples" and dense vocal layers." Slant called attention to the influence of dance and electronic music production techniques on the album. Spin described it as "steeped in '60s-style harmony and post-rock noise," and "mash[ing] up traces of the Beach Boys with digital burbles, elevator chimes, and something that sounds like bubble wrap being popped." Entertainment Weekly also noted influences from the "sunny California sound of the Beach Boys/Mamas and the Papas era [...] filtered through a playful avant-garde sieve." Critic Simon Reynolds described its style as "a unique and refreshing sound [made] almost entirely out of percussion and his own multi-tracked voice," noting the influence of Lennox’s "teenage years singing in a high school choir."

Lennox himself described the songs in advance as "super dubby and old sounding, like Motown or Buddy Holly just a little bit." He acknowledged the Beach Boys as a partial influence on his vocals, but stated that "I feel like if you do multi-part vocal harmonies you're gonna get that no matter what, especially if you put a bunch of reverb on it or make it sound kind of spacey. [...] I certainly don't want to sound like anybody else if I can." He invoked his time in a high school chamber choir as another influence.

Artwork and release

The artwork for Person Pitch and all of the related singles were done by Agnes Montgomery. The album cover artwork is a doctored version of a photo that originally appeared in an August 1969 issue of National Geographic. According to Lennox, "Initially I knew I wanted to do something that was really symmetrical. The album is kind of symmetrical in terms of how long the songs are, and I wanted the album art to reflect that." Included in the artwork was a long list of artists who Lennox credited with influencing him.

Five of the seven tracks on the album were released prior to the album, some of them with different mixing and/or lengths.
 "I'm Not" and "Comfy in Nautica" were released together as a double A-side single in 2005.
 "Bros" was released as a single on Fat Cat Records in late 2006.
 "Good Girl / Carrots" was released in early 2007 on a split 12" with the band Excepter via Animal Collective's own label Paw Tracks (on the single, the song is called, simply, "Carrots").
 "Search for Delicious" was featured in 2005 on Volume 14 of music magazine Comes With a Smiles CD compilations.
 "Take Pills" was released as a 7" single on June 19, 2007. The B-side contains the non-album track "Bonfire of the Vanities"

Despite Lennox's initial assertion that Person Pitch would be issued only on CD, it was announced shortly after its release that it would in fact be pressed on vinyl; the double LP was released on June 19. As of 2011, sales in the US had exceeded 74,000 copies, according to Nielsen SoundScan. In 2017, online record club Vinyl Me, Please. reissued the album on colored vinyl to commemorate the album's 10th anniversary.

Critical reception

Person Pitch was met with almost unanimously positive reviews from music critics. On Metacritic, which assigns a normalized rating out of 100 based on professional critic reviews, the album received an 87, indicating "universal acclaim". Writing in The Observer, Simon Reynolds described the album's sound as "tribal, ecstatic yet eerie, brimming with child-like wonder," and felt that Lennox successfully "pulls off the trick of being simultaneously poppy and abstract". Kevin O'Donnell of Rolling Stone felt that the album "proves he's a first-rate solo artist," and described the album as "a marvelous, hazy trip full of Beach Boys-inspired psychedelia." Leah Greenblatt of Entertainment Weekly described the album as a "lovely, trippy kaleidoscope of sound."  Mark Richardson of Pitchfork felt that Noah Lennox's use of pop melodies gives Person Pitch "an appeal that extends beyond just Animal Collective fans" but that the incorporation of sampled loops and instruments in the production gives the album's songs an "unusual twist".

Slant Magazines Jonathan Keefe praised Person Pitch as "a striking, ambitious take on pop music". Drowned in Sound writer Richard MacFarlane complimented Lennox's "masterful" production on Person Pitch, stating that "these psychedelic hymns and schizophrenic nursery rhymes sound unreal, otherworldly." Phillip Buchan of PopMatters called the album the "most sonically satisfying statement to emerge yet from the Collective", though he was less complimentary towards its lyrics, which he felt lacked a "representational capacity" to "show us anything outside our selves." Retrospectively, Fred Thomas of AllMusic credits Person Pitch as the album where "the wildly different places Lennox would take his experiments truly found a voice of their own", standing as "a perfectly executed statement for Lennox, and in at least some circles of indie rock, a musical revelation."

As of 2017, review aggregate website Acclaimed Music listed Person Pitch as the seventh most acclaimed album of 2007, as well as the 446th most acclaimed album of all time.  It was named the top album of 2007 by Pitchfork and placed at number 13 on The Village Voices Pazz & Jop year-end critics' poll. A Pitchfork year-end survey included praise and recognition from musicians such as Bradford Cox, The Tough Alliance, Diplo, St. Vincent, Black Dice, Christopher Bear of Grizzly Bear, Vampire Weekend, Yeasayer and Dan Snaith, all of whom ranked Person Pitch as one of the best albums of 2007. Pitchfork would later name Person Pitch the ninth best album of the decade. In 2016, Grimes named the album in her list "5 albums that changed my life". She said that "suddenly all music clicked into place and seemed so simple and easy. I was pretty much able to spontaneously write songs immediately after listening to this album once." In 2019, Pitchfork described the album as "a collagist classic of sidelong Beach Boys-isms and kitchen-sink sonics that sits firmly in the sampledelic canon." The Line of Best Fit stated that Lennox won "wild acclaim and admiration for the album’s groundbreaking combo of cutting edge sampledelica and heavily Beach Boys-influenced dream pop" while "the newfound emphasis on electronics also had a huge impact on the output of Lennox’s day job Animal Collective," influencing their 2009 album Merriweather Post Pavilion.

Track listingVinyl edition'''

Influences
The following artists are listed in the liner notes as influences for Person Pitch. About the decision to put this list in the booklet, Lennox said: 

Personnel
Credits adapted from the liner notes of Person Pitch''.

Technical personnel
 Panda Bear – production, mixing
 Rusty Santos – mixing
 Alan Douches – mastering

Artwork
 Agnes Montgomery – artwork
 Rob Carmichael – layout

Charts

Accolades

References

External links
 Paper Thin Walls Interview

2007 albums
Panda Bear (musician) albums
Albums recorded in a home studio
Avant-pop albums
Sampledelia albums